Moravia is a city in Appanoose County, Iowa, United States. The population was 637 at the time of the 2020 census.

History
Moravia is named for the religious faith. Moravian families left Salem, North Carolina in 1849 to start a colony in the west. Money was sent to purchase forty acres of land for a town site by several benevolent Moravian sisters. It was their wish that town lots be sold and the money be used to build a Moravian Church. The families made the long journey to Iowa and acquired many acres of land.

The town site of Moravia was laid out on June 27, 1850 and was recorded July 15, 1851. The surveying was done using a pocket compass and tapeline for measuring instruments. The old ridge road from Unionville, Iowa to Moravia and west to Iconium, Iowa was the Mormon Trail of 1846 from Nauvoo, Illinois to Salt Lake, Utah.

Moravia observed its sesquicentennial anniversary (150th birthday) July 4, 2001. The sesquicentennial anniversary was celebrated with a giant birthday party with events scheduled all day. A Moravian Church was built and dedicated in 1851. The early Moravian Families honored the customs of the Moravian Church, which was founded in the country of Moravia in 1597.

Several of these customs are remembered and celebrated today in Moravia's annual events and festivals. Since the town was founded, it has experienced a rich tradition in the customs of the town's Moravian founders. The Moravia Tour of Homes is an example of a custom founded in the country of Moravia.

Christmas time was a time for Moravians to visit their neighbors and view their colorful Christmas decorations. This custom is remembered and practiced at Christmas time each year by The Moravia Tour of Homes. Another Moravian custom relived each year at Christmas time in Moravia is the Lovefest. The love fest is a traditional religious service with music provided, usually by local talent. Moravian refreshments are served in the tradition of the early Moravians.

Geography
Moravia is located at  (40.890621, -92.815831).

Demographics

2010 census
As of the census of 2010, there were 665 people, 301 households, and 176 families residing in the city. The racial makeup of the city was 98.5% White, 0.2% Native American, 0.2% Asian, and 1.2% from two or more races. Hispanic or Latino of any race were 1.2% of the population.

There were 301 households, of which 26.2% had children under the age of 18 living with them, 41.9% were married couples living together, 12.6% had a female householder with no husband present, 4.0% had a male householder with no wife present, and 41.5% were non-families. 36.5% of all households were made up of individuals, and 19.6% had someone living alone who was 65 years of age or older. The average household size was 2.21 and the average family size was 2.89.

The median age in the city was 42.1 years. 24.4% of residents were under the age of 18; 6.7% were between the ages of 18 and 24; 21.6% were from 25 to 44; 26.3% were from 45 to 64; and 21.1% were 65 years of age or older. The gender makeup of the city was 47.7% male and 52.3% female.

2000 census
As of the census of 2000, there were 713 people, 317 households, and 206 families residing in the city. The racial makeup of the city was 99.02% White, and 0.98% from two or more races. Hispanic or Latino of any race were 0.14% of the population.

There were 317 households, out of which 27.4% had children under the age of 18 living with them, 49.5% were married couples living together, 11.4% had a female householder with no husband present, and 35.0% were non-families. 31.9% of all households were made up of individuals, and 20.8% had someone living alone who was 65 years of age or older. The average household size was 2.25 and the average family size was 2.79.

Age spread: 23.3% under the age of 18, 9.5% from 18 to 24, 21.2% from 25 to 44, 22.7% from 45 to 64, and 23.3% who were 65 years of age or older. The median age was 42 years. For every 100 females, there were 84.7 males. For every 100 females age 18 and over, there were 79.3 males.

The median income for a household in the city was $26,042, and the median income for a family was $29,231. Males had a median income of $26,250 versus $17,212 for females. The per capita income for the city was $15,821. About 7.6% of families and 13.8% of the population were below the poverty line, including 18.7% of those under age 18 and 16.0% of those age 65 or over.

Notable person
Molly Bolin Kazmer (Molly Van Benthuysen), professional women's basketball player with the Iowa Cornets of the Women's Professional Basketball League, grew up in Moravia and was a 1975 graduate of Moravia High School.

See also

Wabash Combination Depot-Moravia, known as the Wabash Railroad Museum, is listed on the National Register of Historic Places

References

External links

 Official website
City-Data Comprehensive Statistical Data and more about Moravia

Cities in Appanoose County, Iowa
Cities in Iowa
Settlements of the Moravian Church
1850 establishments in Iowa
Populated places established in 1850
Moravian Church in the United States